The women's triple jump event  at the 1990 European Athletics Indoor Championships was held in Kelvin Hall on 3 March. This was the first time that this event was held at a major international competition.

Results

References

Triple jump at the European Athletics Indoor Championships
Triple
1990 in women's athletics